Trisapromyza is a genus of flies in the family Lauxaniidae. There are at least two described species in Trisapromyza.

Species
These two species belong to the genus Trisapromyza:
 Trisapromyza pictipes (Becker, 1919)
 Trisapromyza vittigera (Coquillett, 1902)

References

Further reading

 

Lauxaniidae
Articles created by Qbugbot